Derwin Dawayne Williams (born May 6, 1961) is a former wide receiver for the New England Patriots of the National Football League. He played for the Patriots from 1985 through 1987.

After his retirement, Williams became a resident of Pawtucket, Rhode Island, he also began working as a football official and currently works for Conference USA football games. When his son, Mason Williams, became a prospect in baseball, the Williams family moved to Winter Garden, Florida, where Mason could play baseball all year, to increase his chances of receiving a college scholarship. Mason Williams was drafted in the 4th round of the MLB draft and currently plays for the New York Mets.

References

1952 births
Living people
People from Brownwood, Texas
African-American players of American football
American football wide receivers
New Mexico Lobos football players
New England Patriots players
People from Pawtucket, Rhode Island
People from Winter Garden, Florida
21st-century African-American people
20th-century African-American sportspeople